Ərəb (also, Arab-Babaly) is a village and municipality in the Khachmaz Rayon of Azerbaijan.  It has a population of 969.

References 

Populated places in Khachmaz District